Hapoel Be'er Sheva is an Israeli women's football club from Be'er Sheva competing in the Ligat Nashim and the Israeli Women's Cup.

History
The club was established in 2000 and entered the league, where the club had played until relegating at the end of the 2009–10 season. The club bounced straight back to the first division, winning the second division in its first attempt, but relegated back to the second division two seasons later, managing to win a single point the entire season. The club had played in the second division until 2017-18 season. The club played in the first league 2018-19 season. At the end of that season the club was relegated back to the second division for 2019-20 season and bounced back to the first division for season 2020-21.

In the cup, the club had reached the semi-finals seven times, most recently in 2017–18. The club also competed in the Second Division League Cup and won the cup in 2011, beating Maccabi Kishronot Hadera B 7–1 in the final.

Titles
 Israeli Second Division
 2010–11
 Second Division League Cup
 2010–11
 Israeli Second Division
 2017–18
 Israeli Second Division
 2019–20

Current squad

References

External links
 Hapoel Be'er Sheva  Israeli Football Association 

Women's football clubs in Israel
Association football clubs established in 2000